Desamante Manushuloyi is a 1970 Indian Telugu-language political social problem film. The film was directed by C. S. Rao. It received the 1970 National Film Award for Best Feature Film in Telugu.

Awards
National Film Awards
National Film Award for Best Feature Film in Telugu - 1970

References 

1970 films
1970s Telugu-language films
Best Telugu Feature Film National Film Award winners
Films directed by C. S. Rao